Flexi may refer to:

 The flexi disc, a type of vinyl phonograph record
 The "Flexi truck", a type of Forklift truck
 Flexible-fuel vehicles
 Flexitarianism, a semi-vegetarian diet
 Flextime plans, a working arrangement with variable schedules
 Flexi was going to be the preliminary name of Tentro, a character from the Mixels franchise.